In mathematics, the Hadamard product (also known as the element-wise product, entrywise product or Schur product) is a binary operation that takes two matrices of the same dimensions and produces another matrix of the same dimension as the operands, where each element  is the product of elements  of the original two matrices. It is to be distinguished from the more common matrix product. It is attributed to, and named after, either French mathematician Jacques Hadamard or German Russian mathematician Issai Schur.

The Hadamard product is associative and distributive. Unlike the matrix product, it is also commutative.

Definition

Example
For example, the Hadamard product for a 3 × 4 matrix  with a 3 × 4 matrix  is

Properties
 The Hadamard product is commutative (when working with a commutative ring), associative and distributive over addition. That is, if A, B, and C are matrices of the same size, and k is a scalar: 
 The identity matrix under Hadamard multiplication of two  matrices is an  matrix where all elements are equal to 1. This is different from the identity matrix under regular matrix multiplication, where only the elements of the main diagonal are equal to 1. Furthermore, a matrix has an inverse under Hadamard multiplication if and only if none of the elements are equal to zero.
In particular, using vectors of ones, this shows that the sum of all elements in the Hadamard product is the trace of  where superscript T denotes the matrix transpose.
The Hadamard product is a principal submatrix of the Kronecker product.
 The Hadamard product satisfies the rank inequality 

The mixed-product property

 where  denotes face-splitting product.

 where  is column-wise Khatri–Rao product.

Schur product theorem

The Hadamard product of two positive-semidefinite matrices is positive-semidefinite. This is known as the Schur product theorem, after Russian mathematician Issai Schur.

In programming languages
Hadamard multiplication is built into certain programming languages under various names. In MATLAB, GNU Octave, GAUSS and HP Prime, it is known as array multiplication, or in Julia broadcast multiplication, with the symbol .*.
In Python with the NumPy numerical library, multiplication of  objects as a*b  produces the Hadamard product, and multiplication as a@b produces the matrix product. With the SymPy symbolic library, multiplication of  objects as both a*b and a@b will produce the matrix product, the Hadamard product can be obtained with a.multiply_elementwise(b).
In C++, the Eigen library provides a cwiseProduct member function for the  class (a.cwiseProduct(b)), while the Armadillo library uses the operator % to make compact expressions (a % b; a * b is a matrix product). R package matrixcalc introduces function hadamard.prod() for Hadamard Product of numeric matrices or vectors.

Applications
The Hadamard product appears in lossy compression algorithms such as JPEG. The decoding step involves an entry-for-entry product, in other words the Hadamard product.

In image processing, the Hadamard operator can be used for enhancing, suppressing or masking image regions. One matrix represents the original image, the other acts as weight or masking matrix.

It is used in the machine learning literature, for example to describe the architecture of recurrent neural networks as GRUs or LSTMs.

It is also used to study statistical properties of random vectors and matrices.

Analogous operations

For

and for

The  reads:

A  is defined as:

The penetrating face product 

According to the definition of V. Slyusar the penetrating face product of the p×g matrix  and n-dimensional matrix  (n > 1)  with p×g blocks is a matrix of size  of the form:

Example 
If

then

Main properties 

where  denotes the face-splitting product of matrices,
 where  is a vector.

Applications 
The penetrating face product is used in the tensor-matrix theory of digital antenna arrays. This operation can also be used in artificial neural network models, specifically convolutional layers.

See also
 Frobenius inner product
 Pointwise product
 Kronecker product
 Khatri–Rao product

References

Matrix theory